Bridge Number 3355 in Kathio Township, in Mille Lacs County, Minnesota, is a concrete slab bridge that carries U.S. Route 169 (US 169) over Whitefish Creek near Mille Lacs Lake. It is listed on the National Register of Historic Places for its architectural significance, especially the ornamental stonework as designed by the National Park Service and built by the Civilian Conservation Corps.

The basic construction was still a concrete slab, but the abutment extensions, railings, and retaining walls were built of random-coursed granite. This was part of a roadside beautification and wayside development project near the town of Garrison. The elaborate stonework was undertaken as part of the work relief offered through the New Deal, so a labor-intensive approach was chosen.

See also

References

Bridges completed in 1939
Road bridges on the National Register of Historic Places in Minnesota
Bridges of the United States Numbered Highway System
Civilian Conservation Corps in Minnesota
National Register of Historic Places in Mille Lacs County, Minnesota
U.S. Route 169
Concrete bridges in the United States
Buildings and structures in Mille Lacs County, Minnesota
Stone bridges in the United States
National Park Service rustic in Minnesota